Alva E. Kelley (June 16, 1918 – August 21, 1999) was an American football player and coach.  He served as the head football coach at Brown University (1951–1958), Colgate University (1959–1961), and Hobart College (1963–1970), compiling a career college football record of 60–98–5.

Kelley graduated from Cornell University in 1941 after playing three seasons of football under Carl Snavely and fellow fraternity brother George K. James, including the 1939 undefeated national championship season. He was a member of Sphinx Head, the Phi Kappa Psi Fraternity, and through the latter organization, the Irving Literary Society.  He was assistant coach at Cornell from 1946 to 1949, before becoming head coach at Brown University and then Colgate. He was inducted into the Cornell Athletic Hall of Fame in 1980.

Kelley was the 27th head football coach at Colgate University, serving for three seasons, from 1959 to 1961, and compiling a record of 9–18.

One of his great-grandchildren, Will Levis, currently plays football at the University of Kentucky after having played two seasons at Pennsylvania State University.

Head coaching record

References

1918 births
1999 deaths
American football ends
Brown Bears football coaches
Colgate Raiders football coaches
Cornell Big Red football coaches
Cornell Big Red football players
Hobart Statesmen football coaches
Yale Bulldogs football coaches